Rabemananjara Stadium is a multi-purpose stadium in Mahajanga, Madagascar.  It is currently used mostly for and football matches and hosts the homes matches of Tana FC Formation of the THB Champions League.  The stadium has a capacity 8,000 spectators.

References

Football venues in Madagascar
Analamanga